The 1961 European Judo Championships were the 11th edition of the European Judo Championships, and were held in Milan, Italy on 13 May 1961.

Medal winners

References 

European Judo Championships
European Judo Championships
European Judo Championships
Sport in Italy
International sports competitions hosted by Italy
E